Futsal competitions at the 2022 South American Games in Asuncion, Paraguay were held between October 10 and 14, 2022 at the Estadio León Condou.

Schedule
The competition schedule is as follows:

Medal summary

Medal table

Medalists

Participation
Eight nations participated in futsal events of the 2022 South American Games.

References

Futsal
South American Games
2022